Oaks is an unincorporated community in Bee County, in the U.S. state of Texas. It is located within the Beeville micropolitan area.

History
The area in what is now known as Oaks today was first settled in the late 1800s. There were two mills in the community in the mid-1930s. Many residents left after World War II, but the community had two businesses and several scattered homes as late as the mid-1960s. It was classified as a "dispersed farming community" in 2000.

Geography

Education
Schoolchildren in the Oaks community attended County Line School in the mid-1930s. Today, the community is served by the Pawnee Independent School District.

References

Unincorporated communities in Bee County, Texas
Unincorporated communities in Texas